The 65th Rifle Division was an infantry division of the Soviet Union's Red Army.

History 
It fought in World War II. Poirer and Connor say it was established at Chita in February 1941. Began Barbarossa with the 12th Rifle Corps, Transbaikal Military District. Fought near Leningrad and in the Petsamo-Kirkenes Operation.

Became the 102nd Guards Rifle Division on 29 December 1944.

In January 1945, the division was transferred to the Grodno area and included in the 19th Army of the 2nd Belorussian Front.
In February - early April, the division took part in the East Pomeranian Offensive, during which, in cooperation with other formations of the army, on February 26, it captured the town of Schlochau (Człuchów) and at the beginning of March reached the Baltic Sea near Koszalin.

In late March - early April, the division participated in the capture of the naval base and the port of Gdynia and liberation of the "Polish Corridor". 
Subsequently, until the beginning of May, the division conducted operations to block and destroy enemy troops on the western coast of the Danzig Bay. 

In 1945-46, the division performed occupational tasks on the demarcation line of the Mecklenburg province, and was disbanded in 1947.

Components
The division included the following units.
38th Rifle Regiment
60th Rifle Regiment
311th Rifle Regiment
6th Guards Artillery Regiment (former 127th Artillery Regiment)
172nd Howitzer Artillery Regiment (to 28 January 1942)
167th Separate Anti-Tank Battalion
367th Anti-Aircraft Artillery Battery (former 350th Separate Anti-Aircraft Artillery Battalion)
23rd Reconnaissance Company
Ski Battalion (from 13 October 1942 to 10 April 1943)
74th Sapper Battalion
104th Separate Communications Battalion (former 782nd Separate Communications Company)
54th Medical Battalion
210th Separate Chemical Defence Company
230th Motor Transport Company
163rd Field Bakery (former 95th Field Mobile Bakery)
199th Divisional Veterinary Hospital
41st Divisional Artillery Workshop
98th Field Post Office
281st Field Cash Office of the State Bank

References

065
Military units and formations disestablished in 1944
Military units and formations established in 1939
Military units and formations awarded the Order of the Red Banner